Good safety practice (GSP) refers to protocols dealing with safety. The term is often used in connection with occupational safety and health (OSH) and may vary between industries or sectors.

See also
Best practice
Consumer protection 
Good clinical practice
GxP
Public safety

Sources 
 OSHA, European Agency for Safety and Health at Work 
 Good Practice section
 Eurosafe Good Practice Guide
 Good Practice on-line for the Healthcare Sector 

Good
Safety
Good practice